The 2015 UEFA Women's Under-19 Championship was the 14th edition of the UEFA Women's Under-19 Championship (18th edition if the Under-18 era is included), the annual European youth football competition contested by the women's under-19 national teams of the member associations of UEFA. Israel hosted the tournament. Players born on or after 1 January 1996 were eligible to participate in this competition.

Same as previous editions held in odd-numbered years, the tournament acted as the UEFA qualifiers for the FIFA U-20 Women's World Cup. The four semi-finalists qualified for the 2016 FIFA U-20 Women's World Cup in Papua New Guinea as the UEFA representatives.

Qualification

A total of 48 UEFA nations entered the competition, and with the hosts Israel qualifying automatically, the other 47 teams competed in the qualifying competition to determine the remaining seven spots in the final tournament. The qualifying competition consisted of two rounds: Qualifying round, which took place in autumn 2014, and Elite round, which took place in spring 2015.

Qualified teams
The following eight teams qualified for the final tournament.

Note: All appearance statistics include only U-19 era (since 2002).

Notes

Final draw
The final draw was held in Haifa, Israel on 20 May 2015, 20:15 IDT (UTC+3). The eight teams were drawn into two groups of four teams. There were no seeding except that the hosts Israel were assigned to position A1 in the draw.

Venues
The matches were played at four venues in four host cities.

Squads
Each national team had to submit a squad of 18 players.

Sweden

Match officials
A total of 6 referees, 8 assistant referees and 2 fourth officials were appointed for the final tournament.

Referees
 Esther Azzopardi (Malta)
 Lorraine Clark (Scotland)
 Rhona Daly (Republic of Ireland)
 Eleni Lampadariou (Greece)
 Lina Lehtovaara (Finland)
 Ana Minić (Serbia)

Assistant referees
 Biljana Atanasovski Milanova (Macedonia)
 Stephanie Forde (Belgium)
 Fijke Hoogendijk (Netherlands)
 Biljana Iskin (Austria)
 Susanne Küng (Switzerland)
 Mihaela Ţepuşă Gomoescu (Romania)
 Katalin Török (Hungary)
 Diana Vanaga (Latvia)

Fourth officials
 Vesna Budimir (Croatia)
 Tania Fernandes Morais (Luxembourg)

Group stage
Group winners and runners-up advanced to the semi-finals and qualified for the 2016 FIFA U-20 Women's World Cup.

Tiebreakers
if two or more teams were equal on points on completion of the group matches, the following tie-breaking criteria were applied, in the order given, to determine the rankings:
 Higher number of points obtained in the group matches played among the teams in question;
 Superior goal difference resulting from the group matches played among the teams in question;
 Higher number of goals scored in the group matches played among the teams in question;
 If, after having applied criteria 1 to 3, teams still had an equal ranking, criteria 1 to 3 were reapplied exclusively to the group matches between the teams in question to determine their final rankings. If this procedure did not lead to a decision, criteria 5 to 9 applied;
 Superior goal difference in all group matches;
 Higher number of goals scored in all group matches;
 If only two teams had the same number of points, and they were tied according to criteria 1 to 6 after having met in the last round of the group stage, their rankings were determined by a penalty shoot-out (not used if more than two teams had the same number of points, or if their rankings were not relevant for qualification for the next stage).
 Lower disciplinary points total based only on yellow and red cards received in the group matches (red card = 3 points, yellow card = 1 point, expulsion for two yellow cards in one match = 3 points);
 Drawing of lots.

All times were local, IDT (UTC+3).

Group A

Group B

Knockout stage
In the knockout stage, extra time and penalty shoot-out were used to decide the winner if necessary.

Bracket

Semi-finals

Final

Goalscorers
6 goals
 Stina Blackstenius

3 goals

 Marie-Charlotte Léger
 Alba Redondo

2 goals

 Nicoline Sørensen
 Nina Ehegötz
 Rebecca Knaak
 Pilar Garrote
 Filippa Angeldal

1 goal

 Natasha Flint
 Gabrielle George
 Noémie Carage
 Juliane Gathrat
 Clara Matéo
 Madeline Gier
 Eden Avital
 Vilde Fjelldal
 Rocío Gálvez
 Nahikari García
 Sandra Hernández
 Andrea Sánchez
 Tove Almqvist
 Nathalie Björn

Own goals

 Rebecca Knaak (playing against Norway)
 Rocío Gálvez (playing against Germany)
 Emelie Andersson (playing against France)

Team of the tournament

Goalkeepers
 Lena Pauels
 Caitlin Leach
Defenders
 Théa Greboval
 Rebecca Knaak
 Pauline Dhaeyer
 Rocío Gálvez
 Felicitas Rauch
 Nathalie Björn

Midfielders
 Jodie Brett
 Pilar Garrote
 Juliane Gathrat
 Maёlle Garbino
 Sandra Hernández
Forwards
 Stina Blackstenius
 Tove Almqvist
 Nahikari García
 Eden Avital
 Madeline Gier

Golden player:  Stina Blackstenius

Qualified teams for FIFA U-20 Women's World Cup
The following four teams from UEFA qualified for the FIFA U-20 Women's World Cup.

1 Bold indicates champion for that year. Italic indicates host for that year.

References

External links
History – UEFA European Women's Under-19 Championship: 2014/15, UEFA.com
2015 final tournament: Israel, UEFA.com
Official website (Hebrew)

 
2015
Women's Under-19 Championship
UEFA Women's Under-19 Championship
2015 UEFA Women's Under-19 Championship
UEFA Women's Under-19 Championship
July 2015 sports events in Asia
2015 in youth association football
Sport in Netanya
Sport in Rishon LeZion
Sport in Lod
Sport in Ramla
2015 in Israeli women's sport